Duruköy can refer to:

 Duruköy, İspir
 Duruköy, Lice